The Portrait of Doña Antonia Zárate is the source for the 1810–11 portrait of her by Goya or his studio.

In 1900 it was put on show in Madrid and stated to be owned by Doña Adelaida Gil y Zárate. It was bought in London by Sir Otto Beit, who exhibited it at Russborough House and bequeathed it to his son Sir Alfred Beit. It was stolen from Russborough House in 1974 and 1986. A year after the second robbery it was nominally donated by Beit to the National Gallery of Ireland, though it was only recovered from the thieves in 1993.

See also
List of works by Francisco Goya

References

Bibliography 

 Donaldson, Sara. National Gallery of Ireland, Companion Guide. London, 2009 p. 15

External links
Catalogue entry, National Gallery of Ireland

Portraits of women
Portrait of Dona Antonia Zarate
Portraits by Francisco Goya
19th-century portraits
Portrait of Doña Antonia Zárate
Beit collection